Vikram Lall (died 27 December 2020) was an Indian architect and the principal architect and partner of Lall & Associates.

Biography 
Lall had a bachelor's degree in Architecture from the Chandigarh College of Architecture and had a master's degree in Interdisciplinary Design from the University of Cambridge.

He taught at several architectural schools in India and outside, and was also a Visiting Faculty at the School of Planning and Architecture in New Delhi. He was the founder of the non-profit organization Society for Art Appreciation and Research (SAAR).

Lall died on December 27, 2020, in Brussels, Belgium from heart-related complications. While his age was not disclosed, he was noted to be in his late 50s.

Notable projects
Lall was a design management consultant in the creation of the Indian School of Business and aided in the design of Buddha Smriti Park.

Bibliography

External links
 Lall & Associates
 Society for Art Appreciation and Research

References

2020 deaths
21st-century Indian architects
People from Patna
Alumni of the University of Cambridge